Uraecha bimaculata is a species of beetle in the family Cerambycidae. It was described by James Thomson in 1864.

Subspecies
 Uraecha bimaculata brevicornis Makihara, 1980
 Uraecha bimaculata bimaculata Thomson, 1864

References

Lamiini
Beetles described in 1864